William Bray (1682–1720), of Barrington Park, Gloucestershire was a British Army officer and politician who sat in the House of Commons from 1715 to 1720.

Bray was the second son of Reginald Bray of Barrington Park and his wife Jane Rainton, daughter of William Rainton of Shilton, Warwickshire. He joined the British Army as a Cornet in the Royal Horse Guards in 1700 and was promoted captain in 1706 after which he was appointed lieutenant-colonel in the 7th Dragoons in 1711.  He succeeded his elder brother to Barrington Park in 1712.

Bray was elected Whig Member (MP) for Monmouth Boroughs at the 1715 general election. He voted for the Administration, except when he cast his vote against the Peerage Bill proposed in 1719.

Bray died unmarried on 15 April 1720, after which Barrington Park passed to his younger brother Edmund Bray.

References

1682 births
1720 deaths
People from Cotswold District
7th Dragoon Guards officers
Members of the Parliament of Great Britain for Welsh constituencies
British MPs 1715–1722